Miami International Airport , also known as MIA and historically as Wilcox Field, is the primary airport serving the greater Miami metropolitan area with over 1,000 daily flights to 167 domestic and international destinations, including most countries in Latin America. Nearby cities include Hialeah, Doral, and the Census-designated place of Fontainebleau.

In 2021, Miami International Airport became the busiest international cargo airport in the U.S.  and the busiest U.S. gateway for international passengers, surpassing John F. Kennedy International Airport in New York City. As of 2021, it is the 10th busiest airport in the U.S. with 17,500,096 passengers for the year. It is Florida's busiest airport by total aircraft operations, total cargo traffic and total passenger traffic. The airport is American Airlines' third-largest hub and serves as its primary gateway to Latin America and the Caribbean. Miami also serves as a focus city for Avianca, Frontier Airlines, and LATAM, both for passengers and cargo operations.

It is South Florida's main airport for long-haul international flights and a hub for the Southeastern United States with passenger and cargo flights to cities throughout the Americas, Europe, Africa, and Asia. It is the largest gateway between the U.S. and Latin America and the Caribbean and one of the largest airline hubs in the nation.

History 

The first airport on the site of MIA opened in the 1920s and was known as Miami City Airport. Pan American World Airways ("Pan Am") opened an expanded facility adjacent to City Airport, Pan American Field, in 1928. Pan American Field was built on 116 acres of land on 36th Street and was the only mainland airport in the eastern United States that had port of entry facilities. Its runways were located around the threshold of today's Runway 26R. Eastern Air Lines began to serve Pan American Field in 1931, followed by National Airlines in 1936. National used a terminal on the opposite side of LeJeune Road from the airport and would stop traffic on the road in order to taxi aircraft to and from its terminal. Miami Army Airfield opened in 1943 during World War II to the south of Pan American Field. The runways of the two were originally separated by railroad tracks, but the two airfields were listed in some directories as a single facility.

Following World War II in 1945, the City of Miami established a Port Authority and raised bond revenue to purchase Pan American Field, which had been since renamed 36th Street Airport, from Pan Am. It merged with the former Miami Army Airfield, which was purchased from the United States Army Air Force south of the railroad in 1949 and expanded further in 1951 when the railroad line itself was moved south to make more room. United States Air Force Reserve troop carrier and rescue squadrons also operated from the airport from 1949 through 1959, when the last unit relocated to nearby Homestead Air Reserve Base, (now Homestead Air Reserve Base). Pan Am and Eastern also constructed maintenance bases in Miami in the late 1940s, which made the airport the world's largest commercial aircraft maintenance and overhaul facility at the time.

The old terminal on 36th Street was closed in 1959 when the "20th Street Terminal" opened, at the time the largest central airport terminal in the world, with five concourses and a 270-room hotel. This terminal was repeatedly renovated and expanded through the 1990s to create the modern MIA terminal complex. 

Nonstop flights to Chicago and Newark in the northeast New Jersey started in late 1946, but nonstops didn't reach west beyond St. Louis and New Orleans until January 1962. Nonstop transatlantic flights to Europe began in 1970. In the late 1970s and early 1980s, Air Florida had a hub at MIA, with a nonstop flight to London, England which it acquired from National upon the latter's merger with Pan Am. Air Florida ceased operations in 1982 after the crash of Air Florida Flight 90. British Airways flew a Concorde SST (supersonic transport) tri serial between Miami and London via Dulles International Airport in Washington, D.C., from 1984 to 1991.

After former Apollo 8 astronaut Frank Borman became president of Eastern Air Lines in 1975, he moved Eastern's headquarters from Rockefeller Center in New York City to Building 16 in the northeast corner of MIA, Eastern's maintenance base. Eastern remained one of the largest employers in the Miami metropolitan area until ongoing labor union unrest, coupled with the airline's acquisition by union antagonist Frank Lorenzo in 1986, ultimately forced the airline into bankruptcy in 1989. Eastern operated out of Concourses B through D on the north side of the terminal, where American's Concourse D stands today. Concourse E was the home for most international carriers, while Pan Am operated out of Concourses E and F.

American Airlines hub 
Amid Eastern's turmoil, American Airlines CEO Robert Crandall sought a new hub in order to utilize new aircraft which AA had on order. AA studies indicated that Delta Air Lines would provide strong competition on most routes from Eastern's hub at Hartsfield–Jackson Atlanta International Airport in Atlanta, but that MIA had many key routes only served by Eastern. American Airlines announced that it would establish a base at MIA in August 1988. Lorenzo considered selling Eastern's profitable Latin America routes to AA as part of a Chapter 11 reorganization of Eastern in early 1989 but backed out in a last-ditch effort to rebuild the MIA hub. The effort quickly proved futile, and American Airlines purchased the routes (including the route authority between Miami and London then held by Eastern sister company Continental Airlines) in a liquidation of Eastern which was completed in 1990. Later in the 1990s, American transferred more employees and equipment to MIA from its failed domestic hubs at Nashville, Tennessee and Raleigh–Durham, North Carolina. The hub grew from 34 daily departures in 1989 to 157 in 1990, 190 in 1992, and a peak of 301 in 1995, including long-haul flights to Europe and South America. Today Miami is American's largest air freight hub and is the main connecting point in the airline's north–south international route network.

In December 1992, South African Airways launched flights to Johannesburg via Cape Town using a Boeing 747. The company's codeshare agreement with American Airlines supported the route. However, the carrier later decided to codeshare with Delta Air Lines instead, which operated a hub in Atlanta. Consequently, South African Airlines replaced its Miami service with a flight to Atlanta in January 2000.

American began the development of the current North Terminal in the 1990s, which replaced the existing Concourses A through D. Although the terminal was originally scheduled to be completed in 2004, numerous delays arose in the construction process, and Miami-Dade County took over control of the project in 2005, at which time the project had a budget of $2.85 billion. The terminal was ultimately completed in 2011 and included a new "Skytrain" people mover system, as well as a wing for American Eagle commuter flights.

Other hub operations 
Pan Am was acquired by Delta Air Lines in 1991, but filed for bankruptcy shortly thereafter. Its remaining international routes from Miami to Europe and Latin America were sold to United Airlines for $135 million as part of Pan Am's emergency liquidation that December. United's Latin American hub offered 24 daily departures in the summer of 1992, growing to 36 daily departures to 21 destinations in the summer of 1994, but returned to 24 daily departures in the summer of 1995 and never expanded further. United ended flights from Miami to South America, and shut down its Miami crew base, in May 2004, reallocating most Miami resources to its main hub in O'Hare International Airport in Chicago. United ceased all mainline service to Miami in 2005 with the introduction of its low-cost product Ted.

Iberia also established a Miami hub in 1992, positioning a fleet of DC-9 aircraft at MIA to serve destinations in Central America and the Caribbean. The hub took advantage of rights granted under the 1991 bilateral aviation agreement between the United States and Spain. During the 1990s, the airport had sterile international-to-international transit facilities in Concourse D (American, British, and Alitalia) and Concourse F (Iberia and four Central American carriers), and there were plans to establish a sterile corridor for international connecting passengers between six concourses. However, the September 11, 2001, attacks made it necessary for many foreigners to obtain a visa in order to transit the United States, and as a result, United Airlines and Iberia closed their hubs in 2004.

Future 
MIA is projected to process 77 million passengers and 4 million tons of freight annually by 2040. To meet such a demand, the Miami-Dade Board of County Commissioners approved a $5 billion improvement plan to take place over 15 years and concluding in 2035. The comprehensive plan includes concourse optimization, construction of two on-site luxury hotels, the demolition of Concourse G, and expansion of the airport's cargo capacity.

Facilities

Terminals
Miami International Airport contains three terminals (North, Central, and South) and six concourses for a total of 131 gates. With the exception of Concourse G, all concourses contain gates to access U.S. Customs and Border Protection facilities.

Concourse D contains 51 gates. The eastern section opened in 1995 as Concourse A, and the other parts opened in March 2013.
Concourse E contains 18 gates. Opened throughout the early 1980s, the satellite terminal opened in 1974.
Concourse F contains 19 gates. Opened in the 1970s.
Concourse G contains 14 gates. Opened in the mid-1960s.
Concourse H contains 13 gates. Opened in March 1998.
Concourse J contains 15 gates. Opened in August 2007.

American operates three Admirals Clubs and one Flagship Lounge across Concourses D & E. Numerous other lounges exist across the airport as well, including an American Express Centurion Lounge located in Concourse D. The North Terminal (Concourse D) is for the exclusive use of American Airlines. The Central Terminal (Concourses E, F, and G) has varied uses; Concourse E is mainly used by American and its Oneworld partner airlines along with some Caribbean and Latin American airlines, and E's satellite terminal has a gate that can accommodate an Airbus A380. Concourses F and G are used by non-AA domestic and Canadian carriers and flights. The South Terminal (Concourses H and J) is the main non-Oneworld international terminal. Concourse H is largely used by Delta and non-Oneworld international carriers that send narrowbody planes largely from Central and the northern parts of South America, and some widebody flights; and Concourse J is used by most non-Oneworld international carriers that send widebody planes and is the main terminal at MIA for non-Oneworld trans-continental flights. Concourse J also has one gate that can accommodate an A380.

Ground transportation

Miami International Airport uses the MIA Mover, a free people mover system to transfer passengers between MIA terminals and the Miami Intermodal Center (MIC) that opened to the public on September 9, 2011. The MIC provides direct access from the airport to ground transportation (shuttle/bus/rail) as well as rental car companies. A Metrorail station opened at the MIC on July 28, 2012; a  Tri-Rail station followed on April 5, 2015. Plans for Amtrak to operate a station at the MIC have been on hold since it was discovered that the platform built for that purpose was too short for Amtrak trains. As of early 2022, there is still no Amtrak service at the MIC.

The rental car center consolidates airport car rental operations at the MIC.

Miami International Airport has direct public transit service to Miami-Dade Transit's Metrorail, Metrobus network; Greyhound Bus Lines and to the Tri-Rail commuter rail system. Metrorail operates the Orange Line train from Miami International Airport to destinations such as Downtown, Brickell, Health District, Coconut Grove, Coral Gables, Dadeland, Hialeah, South Miami, and Wynwood. It takes approximately 15 minutes to get from the airport to Downtown.

Miami-Dade Transit operates an Airport Flyer bus that connects MIA directly to South Beach.

MIA is served directly by Tri-Rail, Miami's commuter rail system, which began service on April 5, 2015. Tri-Rail connects MIA to northern Miami-Dade, Broward, and Palm Beach counties. Tri-Rail directly serves points north such as: Boca Raton, Deerfield Beach, Delray Beach, Fort Lauderdale, Hollywood, Pompano Beach and West Palm Beach.

Cargo yard
MIA has a number of air cargo facilities. The largest cargo complex is located on the west side of the airport, inside the triangle formed by Runways 12/30 and 9/27. Cargo carriers such as LATAM Cargo, Atlas Air, Amerijet International, and DHL operate from this area. FedEx and UPS operate their own facilities in the northwest corner of the airport, off of 36th Street. In addition to its large passenger terminal in Concourse D, American Airlines operates a maintenance base to the east of Concourse D, centered around a semicircular hangar originally used by National Airlines which can accommodate three widebody aircraft.

Airlines and destinations

Passenger

Cargo

Statistics

Top destinations

Airline market share

Annual traffic

Accidents and incidents 
On January 22, 1952, an Aerodex Lockheed Model 18 Lodestar on a test flight crashed after takeoff due to engine failure, all 5 occupants were killed.
On August 4, 1952, a Curtiss C-46 Commando on a ferry flight crashed on approach to MIA because of the failure of the elevator control system, all 4 occupants died.
On March 25, 1958, Braniff International Airways Flight 971, a Douglas DC-7 crashed 5 km WNW of MIA after attempting to return to the airport because of an engine fire crashing into an open marsh, 9 passengers out of 24 on board were killed.
On October 2, 1959, a Vickers Viscount of Cubana de Aviación was hijacked on a flight from Havana to Antonio Maceo Airport, Santiago by three men demanding to be taken to the United States. The aircraft landed at Miami International Airport.
On February 12, 1963, Northwest Airlines Flight 705, a Boeing 720, crashed into the Everglades while en route from Miami to Portland, Oregon via Chicago O'Hare, Spokane, and Seattle. All 43 passengers and crew perished.
On February 13, 1965, an Aerolíneas de El Salvador (AESA) Curtiss C-46 Commando, a cargo flight, had an engine failure shortly after takeoff and crashed into an automobile junkyard, and both occupants perished.
On March 5, 1965, a Fruehaf Inc. Lockheed Model 18 Lodestar nosed down after takeoff due to elevator trim tab problems, and both occupants were killed.
On June 23, 1969, a Dominicana de Aviación Aviation Traders Carvair, a modified DC-4, en route to Santo Domingo was circling back to Miami International Airport with an engine fire when it crashed into buildings 1 mile short of Runway 27. All 4 crewmembers aboard the Carvair and 6 on the ground were killed.
On April 14, 1970, an Ecuatoriana de Aviacion Douglas DC-7, a cargo flight, crashed after takeoff from MIA beyond the runway and slid 890 feet before striking a concrete abutment, both occupants were killed.
On December 29, 1972, Eastern Air Lines Flight 401, a Lockheed L-1011, crashed into the Everglades. The plane had left JFK International Airport in New York City bound for Miami. There were 101 fatalities out of the 176 passengers and crew on board. (This incident is the subject of the movie The Ghost of Flight 401.)
On June 21, 1973, a Warnaco Inc. Douglas DC-7, a cargo flight, crashed into the Everglades 6 minutes after takeoff in heavy rain, wind, and lightning. All 3 occupants perished.
On December 15, 1973, a Lockheed L-1049 Super Constellation operated by Aircraft Pool Leasing Corp, a cargo flight, crashed 1.3 miles E of MIA because of overrotation of the aircraft causing a stall, crashing into a parking lot and several homes, all 3 occupants were killed along with 6 on the ground.
On September 27, 1975, a Canadair CL-44 operated by Aerotransportes Entre Rios (AER), crashed after takeoff because of an external makeshift flight control lock on the right elevator, 4 crew and 2 passengers of the 10 on board died.
On January 15, 1977, a Douglas DC-3, registration N73KW of Air Sunshine crashed shortly after take-off on a domestic scheduled passenger flight to Key West International Airport, Florida. All 33 people on board survived.
On January 6, 1990, a Grecoair Lockheed JetStar crashed after aborting takeoff and exiting the runway, 1 occupant of the 2 on board died.
On May 11, 1996, ValuJet Airlines Flight 592, a McDonnell Douglas DC-9 crashed into the Everglades 10 minutes after taking off from MIA while en route to Hartsfield-Jackson Atlanta International Airport after a fire broke out in the cargo hold, killing 110 people.
On August 7, 1997, Fine Air Flight 101 , a Douglas DC-8 cargo plane, crashed onto NW 72nd Avenue less than a mile (1.6 km) from the airport. All 4 occupants on board and 1 person on the ground were killed.
On November 20, 2000, American Airlines Flight 1291, an Airbus A300 en route to Port-au-Prince, Haiti, returned to Miami following a cabin depressurization. During the evacuation one of the emergency exit doors explosively opened, killing a flight attendant.
On September 15, 2015, Qatar Airways Flight 778 to Doha overran Runway 9 during takeoff and collided with the approach lights for Runway 27. The collision, which went unnoticed during the 13.5-hour flight, tore a  hole in the pressure vessel of the Boeing 777-300ER aircraft just behind the rear cargo door.
On June 21, 2022, RED Air Flight 203 departed from Las Américas International Airport in the Dominican Republic at 3:36 PM. The aircraft landed at  Miami International Airport on runway 09 at 5:38 PM with their McDonnell Douglas MD-82. Once the aircraft landed, the left main landing gear collapsed, causing the MD-82 to skid off the runway before coming to a halt on the side of runway 09. The damage included the broken right main landing gear was broken, extreme damage to the nose, and a fire on the right wing. There were no reported casualties; three passengers were left with minor injuries.

See also

Transportation in South Florida
List of the busiest airports in the United States
List of tallest air traffic control towers in the United States

References

External links

 

Miami International Airport - Flight Information

 
Airports in Florida
Airports in Miami-Dade County, Florida
Transportation in Miami
Airports established in 1928
1928 establishments in Florida